Črnci (in older sources also Črnce) is a village in the Municipality of Apače in northeastern Slovenia.

The Freudenau Mansion is an originally 17th-century Baroque mansion in the settlement that was renovated in a Neoclassical style in the 19th century.

References

External links 
Črnci on Geopedia

Populated places in the Municipality of Apače